The 1996 Milwaukee Brewers season involved the Brewers finishing third in the American League Central with a record of 80 wins and 82 losses.

Offseason
 January 23, 1996: Ben McDonald was signed as a free agent by the Brewers.

Regular season

Season standings

Record vs. opponents

Game log

|- bgcolor="ccffcc"
| 1 || April 2 || @ Angels || 15–9 || Wickander (1–0) || Finley || — || 27,836 || 1–0
|- bgcolor="ffbbbb"
| 2 || April 3 || @ Angels || 2–3 (11) || James || Lloyd (0–1) || — || 15,024 || 1–1
|- bgcolor="ccffcc"
| 3 || April 5 || @ Mariners || 10–6 || Karl (1–0) || Hurtado || — || 27,768 || 2–1
|- bgcolor="ffbbbb"
| 4 || April 6 || @ Mariners || 5–8 || Johnson || Sparks (0–1) || — || 56,892 || 2–2
|- bgcolor="ffbbbb"
| 5 || April 7 || @ Mariners || 1–3 || Hitchcock || Bones (0–1) || Jackson || 21,004 || 2–3
|- bgcolor="ccffcc"
| 6 || April 9 || Athletics || 10–4 || McDonald (1–0) || Van Poppel || — || 42,090 || 3–3
|- bgcolor="ffbbbb"
| 7 || April 11 || Athletics || 0–11 || Johns || Karl (1–1) || — || 12,236 || 3–4
|- bgcolor="ffbbbb"
| 8 || April 12 || Royals || 1–4 || Appier || Bones (0–2) || Montgomery || 7,113 || 3–5
|- bgcolor="ffbbbb"
| 9 || April 13 || Royals || 2–3 || Gubicza || Sparks (0–2) || Montgomery || 9,224 || 3–6
|- bgcolor="ccffcc"
| 10 || April 14 || Royals || 5–2 || McDonald (2–0) || Haney || Miranda (1) || 19,131 || 4–6
|- bgcolor="ccffcc"
| 11 || April 16 || Yankees || 6–3 || Karl (2–1) || Key || — || 7,059 || 5–6
|- bgcolor="ccffcc"
| 12 || April 17 || Yankees || 8–4 || Bones (1–2) || Cone || — || 7,124 || 6–6
|- bgcolor="ccffcc"
| 13 || April 18 || @ Royals || 8–2 || Sparks (1–2) || Gubicza || — || 13,153 || 7–6
|- bgcolor="ccffcc"
| 14 || April 19 || @ Royals || 8–2 || McDonald (3–0) || Haney || — || 15,321 || 8–6
|- bgcolor="ccffcc"
| 15 || April 20 || @ Royals || 12–4 || Miranda (1–0) || Jacome || — || 17,220 || 9–6
|- bgcolor="ccffcc"
| 16 || April 21 || @ Royals || 5–4 || Wickander (2–0) || Pichardo || Fetters (1) || 14,666 || 10–6
|- bgcolor="ffbbbb"
| 17 || April 22 || @ Athletics || 2–6 || Reyes || Bones (1–3) || Briscoe || 6,021 || 10–7
|- bgcolor="ffbbbb"
| 18 || April 23 || @ Athletics || 6–9 || Wojciechowski || Sparks (1–3) || Mohler || 7,026 || 10–8
|- bgcolor="ffbbbb"
| 19 || April 24 || Angels || 3–4 || Boskie || McDonald (3–1) || Percival || 7,051 || 10–9
|- bgcolor="ccffcc"
| 20 || April 25 || Angels || 6–5 || Fetters (1–0) || James || — || 6,707 || 11–9
|- bgcolor="ffbbbb"
| 21 || April 26 || Mariners || 5–6 || Carmona || Potts (0–1) || Charlton || 13,072 || 11–10
|- bgcolor="ffbbbb"
| 22 || April 27 || Mariners || 5–6 || Wells || Bones (1–4) || Charlton || 17,270 || 11–11
|- bgcolor="ccffcc"
| 23 || April 28 || Mariners || 16–9 || Potts (1–1) || Davis || — || 19,717 || 12–11
|- bgcolor="ffbbbb"
| 24 || April 30 || @ Blue Jays || 8–9 || Crabtree || Boze (0–1) || — || 25,467 || 12–12
|-

|- bgcolor="ffbbbb"
| 25 || May 1 || @ Blue Jays || 3–9 || Guzman || Miranda (1–1) || — || 25,684 || 12–13
|- bgcolor="ffbbbb"
| 26 || May 2 || @ Blue Jays || 5–7 || Hanson || Karl (2–2) || Timlin || 31,299 || 12–14
|- bgcolor="ffbbbb"
| 27 || May 3 || @ Orioles || 2–8 || Erickson || Bones (1–5) || — || 41,037 || 12–15
|- bgcolor="ffbbbb"
| 28 || May 4 || @ Orioles || 5–10 || Mussina || Sparks (1–4) || — || 44,175 || 12–16
|- bgcolor="ccffcc"
| 29 || May 5 || @ Orioles || 13–1 || McDonald (4–1) || Haynes || — || 46,027 || 13–16
|- bgcolor="ffbbbb"
| 30 || May 7 || Red Sox || 2–4 || Clemens || Miranda (1–2) || Slocumb || 7,039 || 13–17
|- bgcolor="ccffcc"
| 31 || May 9 || Red Sox || 17–2 || Bones (2–5) || Sele || — || 7,379 || 14–17
|- bgcolor="ffbbbb"
| 32 || May 10 || Orioles || 7–10 (12) || Orosco || Garcia (0–1) || McDowell || 9,520 || 14–18
|- bgcolor="ffbbbb"
| 33 || May 11 || Orioles || 3–5 (10) || Rhodes || Potts (1–2) || Myers || 21,081 || 14–19
|- bgcolor="ccffcc"
| 34 || May 12 || Orioles || 6–4 || Miranda (2–2) || Erickson || Fetters (2) || 14,333 || 15–19
|- bgcolor="ccffcc"
| 35 || May 13 || White Sox || 6–2 || Sparks (2–4) || Baldwin || Boze (1) || 9,544 || 16–19
|- bgcolor="ffbbbb"
| 36 || May 15 || White Sox || 8–20 || Alvarez || Bones (2–6) || Keyser || 8,733 || 16–20
|- bgcolor="ccffcc"
| 37 || May 16 || White Sox || 3–2 || Lloyd (1–1) || Tapani || Fetters (3) || 13,849 || 17–20
|- bgcolor="ccffcc"
| 38 || May 17 || @ Twins || 12–1 || Karl (3–2) || Parra || — || 26,733 || 18–20
|- bgcolor="ccffcc"
| 39 || May 18 || @ Twins || 7–3 || Miranda (3–2) || Mahomes || Fetters (4) || 30,593 || 19–20
|- bgcolor="ccffcc"
| 40 || May 19 || @ Twins || 4–2 || Sparks (3–4) || Robertson || Fetters (5) || 24,411 || 20–20
|- bgcolor="ccffcc"
| 41 || May 20 || @ Twins || 3–2 || Bones (3–6) || Rodriguez || Fetters (6) || 13,376 || 21–20
|- bgcolor="ffbbbb"
| 42 || May 21 || @ Indians || 5–6 || Tavarez || Boze (0–2) || — || 39,974 || 21–21
|- bgcolor="ccffcc"
| 43 || May 22 || @ Indians || 10–8 || Karl (4–2) || McDowell || Fetters (7) || 41,027 || 22–21
|- bgcolor="ffbbbb"
| 44 || May 23 || @ Indians || 1–5 || Hershiser || Miranda (3–3) || — || 42,395 || 22–22
|- bgcolor="ffbbbb"
| 45 || May 24 || @ White Sox || 3–4 || Thomas || Sparks (3–5) || Hernandez || 18,346 || 22–23
|- bgcolor="ffbbbb"
| 46 || May 25 || @ White Sox || 7–9 || Alvarez || Bones (3–7) || Hernandez || 20,585 || 22–24
|- bgcolor="ffbbbb"
| 47 || May 26 || @ White Sox || 1–12 || Tapani || McDonald (4–2) || — || 21,151 || 22–25
|- bgcolor="ccffcc"
| 48 || May 28 || Twins || 7–3 || Karl (5–2) || Mahomes || Garcia (1) || 10,117 || 23–25
|- bgcolor="ffbbbb"
| 49 || May 29 || Twins || 7–8 (12) || Hansell || Lloyd (1–2) || — || 14,324 || 23–26
|- bgcolor="ffbbbb"
| 50 || May 30 || Indians || 0–2 || Nagy || Bones (3–8) || Mesa || 11,543 || 23–27
|- bgcolor="ffbbbb"
| 51 || May 31 || Indians || 4–10 || Martinez || McDonald (4–3) || — || 24,050 || 23–28
|-

|- bgcolor="ccffcc"
| 52 || June 1 || Indians || 2–1 || Garcia (1–1) || McDowell || Fetters (8) || 22,004 || 24–28
|- bgcolor="ffbbbb"
| 53 || June 2 || Indians || 6–11 || Poole || Karl (5–3) || — || 21,150 || 24–29
|- bgcolor="ffbbbb"
| 54 || June 3 || Rangers || 6–9 || Witt || Sparks (3–6) || Henneman || 9,748 || 24–30
|- bgcolor="ccffcc"
| 55 || June 4 || Rangers || 6–2 || Bones (4–8) || Gross || — || 10,685 || 25–30
|- bgcolor="ccffcc"
| 56 || June 5 || Rangers || 6–4 || McDonald (5–3) || Hill || Fetters (9) || 11,276 || 26–30
|- bgcolor="ffbbbb"
| 57 || June 7 || @ Red Sox || 7–10 || Garces || Garcia (1–2) || Slocumb || 26,861 || 26–31
|- bgcolor="ccffcc"
| 58 || June 8 || @ Red Sox || 3–2 (10) || Lloyd (2–2) || Hudson || Fetters (10) || 30,399 || 27–31
|- bgcolor="ccffcc"
| 59 || June 9 || @ Red Sox || 11–8 (10) || Burrows (1–0) || Slocumb || Fetters (11) || 28,120 || 28–31
|- bgcolor="ffbbbb"
| 60 || June 10 || @ Rangers || 3–8 || Gross || Givens (0–1) || — || 43,275 || 28–32
|- bgcolor="ccffcc"
| 61 || June 11 || @ Rangers || 14–4 || McDonald (6–3) || Hill || Garcia (2) || 33,519 || 29–32
|- bgcolor="ffbbbb"
| 62 || June 12 || @ Rangers || 6–13 || Pavlik || Miranda (3–4) || — || 34,842 || 29–33
|- bgcolor="ccffcc"
| 63 || June 13 || Athletics || 16–3 || Karl (6–3) || Wojciechowski || — || 12,439 || 30–33
|- bgcolor="ccffcc"
| 64 || June 14 || Athletics || 6–2 || Bones (5–8) || Wasdin || — || 14,404 || 31–33
|- bgcolor="ccffcc"
| 65 || June 15 || Athletics || 12–9 || Givens (1–1) || Wengert || Garcia (3) || 21,064 || 32–33
|- bgcolor="ffbbbb"
| 66 || June 16 || Athletics || 9–10 || Taylor || Fetters (1–1) || Mohler || 26,744 || 32–34
|- bgcolor="ccffcc"
| 67 || June 17 || Royals || 9–4 || Burrows (2–0) || Appier || — || 9,315 || 33–34
|- bgcolor="ccffcc"
| 68 || June 18 || Royals || 9–1 || Karl (7–3) || Linton || Potts (1) || 9,116 || 34–34
|- bgcolor="ffbbbb"
| 69 || June 19 || Royals || 4–8 (10) || Pichardo || Mercedes (0–1) || — || 13,431 || 34–35
|- bgcolor="ffbbbb"
| 70 || June 20 || Angels || 3–10 || Langston || Givens (1–2) || — || 16,034 || 34–36
|- bgcolor="ccffcc"
| 71 || June 21 || Angels || 10–5 || McDonald (7–3) || Abbott || — || 16,274 || 35–36
|- bgcolor="ffbbbb"
| 72 || June 22 || Angels || 4–6 || Boskie || Miranda (3–5) || Percival || 35,464 || 35–37
|- bgcolor="ccffcc"
| 73 || June 23 || Angels || 8–4 || Garcia (2–2) || Finley || — || 17,051 || 36–37
|- bgcolor="ccffcc"
| 74 || June 25 || @ Royals || 5–3 || Bones (6–8) || Gubicza || Fetters (12) || 14,448 || 37–37
|- bgcolor="ffbbbb"
| 75 || June 26 || @ Royals || 3–7 || Haney || Givens (1–3) || — || 14,560 || 37–38
|- bgcolor="ccffcc"
| 76 || June 27 || @ Royals || 6–2 || McDonald (8–3) || Belcher || — || 17,670 || 38–38
|- bgcolor="ccffcc"
| 77 || June 28 || @ Blue Jays || 5–1 || D'Amico (1–0) || Guzman || Fetters (13) || 31,333 || 39–38
|- bgcolor="ccffcc"
| 78 || June 29 || @ Blue Jays || 7–4 || Karl (8–3) || Janzen || — || 31,170 || 40–38
|- bgcolor="ffbbbb"
| 79 || June 30 || @ Blue Jays || 2–15 || Hanson || Bones (6–9) || — || 30,104 || 40–39
|-

|- bgcolor="ccffcc"
| 80 || July 1 || @ Tigers || 2–0 || Sparks (4–6) || Olivares || Fetters (14) || 10,727 || 41–39
|- bgcolor="ccffcc"
| 81 || July 2 || @ Tigers || 2–1 (11) || Garcia (3–2) || Sager || Fetters (15) || 9,455 || 42–39
|- bgcolor="ffbbbb"
| 82 || July 3 || @ Tigers || 5–8 || Williams || D'Amico (1–1) || — || 11,047 || 42–40
|- bgcolor="ffbbbb"
| 83 || July 4 || @ Yankees || 1–4 || Pettitte || Karl (8–4) || Wetteland || 24,243 || 42–41
|- bgcolor="ffbbbb"
| 84 || July 5 || @ Yankees || 3–12 || Gooden || Bones (6–10) || — || 26,699 || 42–42
|- bgcolor="ffbbbb"
| 85 || July 6 || @ Yankees || 0–2 || Key || Sparks (4–7) || Wetteland || 24,033 || 42–43
|- bgcolor="ccffcc"
| 86 || July 7 || @ Yankees || 4–1 || McDonald (9–3) || Rogers || Fetters (16) || 35,242 || 43–43
|- bgcolor="ffbbbb"
| 87 || July 11 || Blue Jays || 3–6 || Guzman || D'Amico (1–2) || Castillo || 16,019 || 43–44
|- bgcolor="ccffcc"
| 88 || July 12 || Blue Jays || 12–5 || McDonald (10–3) || Hanson || — || 15,691 || 44–44
|- bgcolor="ffbbbb"
| 89 || July 13 || Blue Jays || 7–15 || Hentgen || Karl (8–5) || — || 29,383 || 44–45
|- bgcolor="ffbbbb"
| 90 || July 14 || Blue Jays || 5–7 (10) || Crabtree || Garcia (3–3) || Timlin || 20,798 || 44–46
|- bgcolor="ffbbbb"
| 91 || July 15 || Tigers || 9–10 || Sager || Bones (6–11) || Olson || 15,819 || 44–47
|- bgcolor="ccffcc"
| 92 || July 16 || Tigers || 20–7 || D'Amico (2–2) || Williams || — || 12,476 || 45–47
|- bgcolor="ccffcc"
| 93 || July 17 || Tigers || 3–2 (10) || Fetters (2–1) || Urbani || — || 21,121 || 46–47
|- bgcolor="ccffcc"
| 94 || July 18 || Yankees || 16–4 || Karl (9–5) || Gooden || — || 19,079 || 47–47
|- bgcolor="ccffcc"
| 95 || July 19 || Yankees || 7–5 || Eldred (1–0) || Pettitte || Fetters (17) || 19,300 || 48–47
|- bgcolor="ffbbbb"
| 96 || July 20 || Yankees || 2–4 || Rivera || Van Egmond (0–1) || Wetteland || 25,473 || 48–48
|- bgcolor="ccffcc"
| 97 || July 21 || Yankees || 3–2 || D'Amico (3–2) || Key || Fetters (18) || 25,662 || 49–48
|- bgcolor="ffbbbb"
| 98 || July 22 || @ Mariners || 3–8 || Wagner || Mercedes (0–2) || — || 40,555 || 49–49
|- bgcolor="ccffcc"
| 99 || July 23 || @ Mariners || 7–3 || Karl (10–5) || Carmona || — || 22,378 || 50–49
|- bgcolor="ffbbbb"
| 100 || July 24 || @ Mariners || 7–8 || Ayala || Fetters (2–2) || — || 19,899 || 50–50
|- bgcolor="ffbbbb"
| 101 || July 25 || @ Angels || 4–5 || Holtz || Lloyd (2–3) || — || 16,841 || 50–51
|- bgcolor="ffbbbb"
| 102 || July 26 || @ Angels || 5–6 || Springer || D'Amico (3–3) || Percival || 18,189 || 50–52
|- bgcolor="ffbbbb"
| 103 || July 27 || @ Angels || 0–7 || Finley || McDonald (10–4) || — || 17,497 || 50–53
|- bgcolor="ccffcc"
| 104 || July 28 || @ Angels || 4–3 (13) || Miranda (4–5) || Holtz || Garcia (4) || 25,539 || 51–53
|- bgcolor="ffbbbb"
| 105 || July 30 || Mariners || 5–6 || Wells || Eldred (1–1) || Ayala || — || 51–54
|- bgcolor="ccffcc"
| 106 || July 30 || Mariners || 4–3 || Van Egmond (1–1) || Wolcott || Fetters (19) || 18,591 || 52–54
|- bgcolor="ffbbbb"
| 107 || July 31 || Mariners || 3–9 || Hitchcock || D'Amico (3–4) || — || 30,772 || 52–55
|-

|- bgcolor="ffbbbb"
| 108 || August 1 || Mariners || 2–9 || Moyer || McDonald (10–5) || — || 18,425 || 52–56
|- bgcolor="ccffcc"
| 109 || August 2 || @ Athletics || 4–3 (10) || Miranda (5–5) || Taylor || Fetters (20) || 10,056 || 53–56
|- bgcolor="ccffcc"
| 110 || August 3 || @ Athletics || 7–0 || Bones (7–11) || Johns || — || 15,171 || 54–56
|- bgcolor="ffbbbb"
| 111 || August 4 || @ Athletics || 2–4 || Telgheder || Van Egmond (1–2) || Taylor || 10,281 || 54–57
|- bgcolor="ccffcc"
| 112 || August 5 || @ Athletics || 13–3 || Eldred (2–1) || Adams || — || 8,616 || 55–57
|- bgcolor="ffbbbb"
| 113 || August 6 || Orioles || 3–13 || Mussina || McDonald (10–6) || — || 17,075 || 55–58
|- bgcolor="ffbbbb"
| 114 || August 7 || Orioles || 2–12 || Erickson || Karl (10–6) || — || 20,287 || 55–59
|- bgcolor="ffbbbb"
| 115 || August 8 || Orioles || 4–6 || Coppinger || D'Amico (3–5) || Myers || 18,620 || 55–60
|- bgcolor="ffbbbb"
| 116 || August 9 || Red Sox || 7–9 || Suppan || Van Egmond (1–3) || Slocumb || — || 55–61
|- bgcolor="ffbbbb"
| 117 || August 9 || Red Sox || 1–4 || Eshelman || Bones (7–12) || Belinda || 19,541 || 55–62
|- bgcolor="ffbbbb"
| 118 || August 10 || Red Sox || 2–3 || Wakefield || Eldred (2–2) || — || 20,297 || 55–63
|- bgcolor="ffbbbb"
| 119 || August 11 || Red Sox || 0–2 || Clemens || McDonald (10–7) || Belinda || 19,178 || 55–64
|- bgcolor="ffbbbb"
| 120 || August 13 || @ Orioles || 3–4 || Corbin || Lloyd (2–4) || Myers || 44,461 || 55–65
|- bgcolor="ffbbbb"
| 121 || August 14 || @ Orioles || 5–8 || Milchin || Bones (7–13) || Myers || 47,480 || 55–66
|- bgcolor="ccffcc"
| 122 || August 16 || White Sox || 9–7 || Miranda (6–5) || Levine || Villone (1) || — || 56–66
|- bgcolor="ccffcc"
| 123 || August 16 || White Sox || 3–2 || Van Egmond (2–3) || Tapani || Fetters (21) || 25,529 || 57–66
|- bgcolor="ffbbbb"
| 124 || August 17 || White Sox || 2–6 || Fernandez || McDonald (10–8) || Hernandez || 31,551 || 57–67
|- bgcolor="ccffcc"
| 125 || August 18 || White Sox || 8–7 || Miranda (7–5) || Darwin || Fetters (22) || 33,094 || 58–67
|- bgcolor="ccffcc"
| 126 || August 19 || @ Twins || 6–1 || D'Amico (4–5) || Rodriguez || — || 21,879 || 59–67
|- bgcolor="ffbbbb"
| 127 || August 20 || @ Twins || 7–12 || Parra || Bones (7–14) || — || 14,630 || 59–68
|- bgcolor="ccffcc"
| 128 || August 21 || @ Twins || 10–7 || Jones (1–0) || Stevens || Fetters (23) || 15,885 || 60–68
|- bgcolor="ccffcc"
| 129 || August 23 || @ Indians || 6–5 (11) || Jones (2–0) || Mesa || Fetters (24) || 42,405 || 61–68
|- bgcolor="ccffcc"
| 130 || August 24 || @ Indians || 4–3 (10) || Wickman (1–0) || Plunk || Fetters (25) || 42,437 || 62–68
|- bgcolor="ffbbbb"
| 131 || August 25 || @ Indians || 5–8 || Shuey || Miranda (7–6) || Mesa || 42,335 || 62–69
|- bgcolor="ccffcc"
| 132 || August 26 || @ White Sox || 3–2 || Eldred (3–2) || Alvarez || Jones (1) || 19,637 || 63–69
|- bgcolor="ccffcc"
| 133 || August 27 || @ White Sox || 4–2 || Van Egmond (3–3) || Fernandez || Fetters (26) || 15,443 || 64–69
|- bgcolor="ffbbbb"
| 134 || August 28 || @ White Sox || 0–2 || Baldwin || McDonald (10–9) || Hernandez || 17,269 || 64–70
|- bgcolor="ffbbbb"
| 135 || August 29 || Twins || 1–6 || Rodriguez || Karl (10–7) || — || 14,922 || 64–71
|- bgcolor="ccffcc"
| 136 || August 30 || Twins || 5–4 (12) || Wickman (2–0) || Parra || — || 17,444 || 65–71
|- bgcolor="ccffcc"
| 137 || August 31 || Twins || 3–2 || Jones (3–0) || Robertson || Fetters (27) || 20,187 || 66–71
|-

|- bgcolor="ffbbbb"
| 138 || September 1 || Twins || 2–6 || Aldred || Van Egmond (3–4) || — || 17,074 || 66–72
|- bgcolor="ccffcc"
| 139 || September 2 || Indians || 7–6 || Jones (4–0) || Mesa || — || 18,015 || 67–72
|- bgcolor="ccffcc"
| 140 || September 3 || Indians || 8–2 || Karl (11–7) || Hershiser || — || 10,599 || 68–72
|- bgcolor="ffbbbb"
| 141 || September 4 || Indians || 0–7 || Ogea || D'Amico (4–6) || — || 12,666 || 68–73
|- bgcolor="ffbbbb"
| 142 || September 6 || Rangers || 3–7 || Burkett || Eldred (3–3) || — || 16,714 || 68–74
|- bgcolor="ffbbbb"
| 143 || September 7 || Rangers || 1–2 || Hill || McDonald (10–10) || Henneman || 19,110 || 68–75
|- bgcolor="ffbbbb"
| 144 || September 8 || Rangers || 1–7 || Witt || Florie (0–1) || — || 17,542 || 68–76
|- bgcolor="ccffcc"
| 145 || September 9 || @ Red Sox || 6–0 || Karl (12–7) || Gordon || — || 22,386 || 69–76
|- bgcolor="ccffcc"
| 146 || September 10 || @ Red Sox || 11–10 || Garcia (4–3) || Hudson || Fetters (28) || 20,487 || 70–76
|- bgcolor="ffbbbb"
| 147 || September 11 || @ Red Sox || 1–4 || Wakefield || Eldred (3–4) || Slocumb || 21,310 || 70–77
|- bgcolor="ccffcc"
| 148 || September 12 || @ Rangers || 15–4 || McDonald (11–10) || Hill || — || 41,303 || 71–77
|- bgcolor="ccffcc"
| 149 || September 13 || @ Rangers || 6–3 || D'Amico (5–6) || Witt || Fetters (29) || 39,235 || 72–77
|- bgcolor="ccffcc"
| 150 || September 14 || @ Rangers || 8–6 || Karl (13–7) || Pavlik || Fetters (30) || 45,901 || 73–77
|- bgcolor="ffbbbb"
| 151 || September 15 || @ Rangers || 2–6 || Oliver || Garcia (4–4) || Vosberg || 45,941 || 73–78
|- bgcolor="ccffcc"
| 152 || September 17 || Blue Jays || 4–0 || McDonald (12–10) || Andujar || — || 10,184 || 74–78
|- bgcolor="ccffcc"
| 153 || September 18 || Blue Jays || 2–1 || Fetters (3–2) || Timlin || — || 9,550 || 75–78
|- bgcolor="ffbbbb"
| 154 || September 20 || Tigers || 1–10 || Sager || Karl (13–8) || — || 15,046 || 75–79
|- bgcolor="ccffcc"
| 155 || September 21 || Tigers || 13–6 || D'Amico (6–6) || Van Poppel || Villone (2) || 33,106 || 76–79
|- bgcolor="ffbbbb"
| 156 || September 22 || Tigers || 5–7 || Lima || Fetters (3–3) || — || 15,705 || 76–80
|- bgcolor="ccffcc"
| 157 || September 23 || @ Orioles || 8–7 (10) || Jones (5–0) || Mathews || Fetters (31) || 46,542 || 77–80
|- bgcolor="ffbbbb"
| 158 || September 25 || @ Yankees || 2–19 || Cone || Van Egmond (3–5) || — || — || 77–81
|- bgcolor="ffbbbb"
| 159 || September 25 || @ Yankees || 2–6 || Rogers || Karl (13–9) || — || 37,947 || 77–82
|- bgcolor="ccffcc"
| 160 || September 27 || @ Tigers || 7–6 (6) || Wickman (3–0) || Van Poppel || — || 8,606 || 78–82
|- bgcolor="ccffcc"
| 161 || September 28 || @ Tigers || 7–2 || Eldred (4–4) || Moehler || — || 12,939 || 79–82
|- bgcolor="ccffcc"
| 162 || September 29 || @ Tigers || 7–5 (10) || Reyes (1–0) || Cummings || Fetters (32) || 13,038 || 80–82
|-

|-
| Legend:       = Win       = LossBold = Brewers team member

Detailed records

Notable transactions
 July 31, 1996: Greg Vaughn and a player to be named later were traded by the Brewers to the San Diego Padres for Marc Newfield, Bryce Florie and Ron Villone. The Brewers completed the deal by sending Gerald Parent (minors) to the Padres on September 16.
 August 23, 1996: Pat Listach, Graeme Lloyd and a player to be named later were traded by the Brewers to the New York Yankees for Bob Wickman and Gerald Williams. The Brewers completed the deal by sending Ricky Bones to the Yankees on August 29.

Roster

Player stats

Batting

Starters by position
Note: Pos = Position; G = Games played; AB = At bats; H = Hits; Avg. = Batting average; HR = Home runs; RBI = Runs batted in

Other batters
Note: G = Games played; AB = At bats; H = Hits; Avg. = Batting average; HR = Home runs; RBI = Runs batted in

Pitching

Starting pitchers
Note: G = Games pitched; IP = Innings pitched; W = Wins; L = Losses; ERA = Earned run average; SO = Strikeouts

Other pitchers
Note: G = Games pitched; IP = Innings pitched; W = Wins; L = Losses; ERA = Earned run average; SO = Strikeouts

Relief pitchers
Note: G = Games pitched; W = Wins; L = Losses; SV = Saves; ERA = Earned run average; SO = Strikeouts

Farm system

The Brewers' farm system consisted of seven minor league affiliates in 1996. The Brewers operated a Dominican Summer League team as a co-op with the Chicago White Sox. The Helena Brewers won the Pioneer League championship.

References

1996 Milwaukee Brewers team page at Baseball Reference
1996 Milwaukee Brewers team page at www.baseball-almanac.com

Milwaukee Brewers seasons
Milwaukee Brewers season
Milwaukee Brew